The Trent is the third-longest river in the United Kingdom. Its source  is in Staffordshire, on the southern edge of Biddulph Moor.  It flows through and drains the North Midlands. The river is known for dramatic flooding after storms and spring snowmelt, which in the past often caused the river to change course.

The river passes through Stoke-on-Trent,  Stone, Rugeley, Burton upon Trent and Nottingham before joining the River Ouse at Trent Falls to form the Humber Estuary, which empties into the North Sea between Hull in Yorkshire and Immingham in Lincolnshire. The wide Humber estuary has often been described as the boundary between the Midlands and the north of England.

Name
The name "Trent" is possibly from a Romano-British word meaning "strongly flooding". More specifically, the name may be a contraction of two Romano-British words, tros ("over") and hynt ("way"). This may indeed indicate a river that is prone to flooding. However, a more likely explanation may be that it was considered to be a river that could be crossed principally by means of fords, i.e. the river flowed over major road routes. This may explain the presence of the Romano-British element rid (cf. Welsh rhyd, "ford") in various place names along the Trent, such as Hill Ridware, as well as the Old English‐derived ford. Another translation is given as "the trespasser", referring to the waters flooding over the land. According to Koch at the University of Wales, the name Trent derives from the Romano-British Trisantona, a Romano-British reflex of the combined  elements *tri-sent(o)-on-ā- (through-path-augmentative-feminine-) ‘great thoroughfare’. A traditional but almost certainly wrong opinion is that of Izaak Walton, who states in The Compleat Angler (1653) that the Trent is "... so called from thirty kind of fishes that are found in it, or for that it receiveth thirty lesser rivers."

Course
The Trent rises within the Staffordshire Moorlands district, near the village of Biddulph Moor, from a number of sources including the Trent Head Well. It is then joined by other small streams to form the Head of Trent, which flows south, to the only reservoir along its course at Knypersley. Downstream of the reservoir it passes through Stoke-on-Trent and merges with the Lyme, Fowlea and other brooks that drain the six towns of the Staffordshire Potteries to become the River Trent. On the southern fringes of Stoke, it passes through the landscaped parkland of Trentham Gardens.

The river then continues south through the market town of Stone, and after passing the village of Salt, it reaches Great Haywood, where it is spanned by the 16th-century Essex Bridge near Shugborough Hall. At this point the River Sow joins it from Stafford. The Trent now flows south-east past the town of Rugeley until it reaches Kings Bromley where it meets the Blithe. After the confluence with the Swarbourn, it passes Alrewas and reaches Wychnor, where it is crossed by the A38 dual carriageway, which follows the route of the Roman Ryknild Street. The river turns north-east where it is joined by its largest tributary, the Tame (which is at this point actually the larger, though its earlier length shorter) and immediately afterwards by the Mease, creating a larger river that now flows through a broad floodplain.

The river continues north-east, passing the village of Walton-on-Trent until it reaches the large town of Burton upon Trent. The river in Burton is crossed by a number of bridges including the ornate 19th-century Ferry Bridge that links Stapenhill to the town. To the north-east of Burton the river is joined by the River Dove at Newton Solney and enters Derbyshire, before passing between the villages of Willington and Repton where it turns directly east to reach Swarkestone Bridge. Shortly afterwards, the river becomes the Derbyshire-Leicestershire border, passing the traditional crossing point of King's Mill, Castle Donington, Weston-on-Trent and Aston-on-Trent.

At Shardlow, where the Trent and Mersey Canal begins, the river also meets the Derwent at Derwent Mouth. After this confluence, the river turns north-east and is joined by the Soar before reaching the outskirts of Nottingham, where it is joined by the Erewash near the Attenborough nature reserve and enters Nottinghamshire. As it enters the city, it passes the suburbs of Beeston, Clifton and Wilford; where it is joined by the Leen. On reaching West Bridgford it flows beneath Trent Bridge near the cricket ground of the same name, and beside The City Ground, home of Nottingham Forest, until it reaches Holme Sluices.

Downstream of Nottingham it passes Radcliffe on Trent, Stoke Bardolph and Burton Joyce before reaching Gunthorpe with its bridge, lock and weir. The river now flows north-east below the Toot and Trent Hills before reaching Hazelford Ferry, Fiskerton and Farndon. To the north of Farndon, beside the Staythorpe Power Station the river splits, with one arm passing Averham and Kelham, and the other arm, which is navigable, being joined by the Devon before passing through the market town of Newark-on-Trent and beneath the town's castle walls. The two arms recombine at Crankley Point beyond the town, where the river turns due north to pass North Muskham and Holme to reach Cromwell Weir, below which the Trent becomes tidal.

The now tidal river meanders across a wide floodplain, at the edge of which are located riverside villages such as Carlton and Sutton on Trent, Besthorpe and Girton. After passing the site of High Marnham power station, it becomes the approximate boundary between Nottinghamshire and Lincolnshire and reaches the only toll bridge along its course at Dunham on Trent. Downstream of Dunham the river passes Church Laneham and reaches Torksey, where it meets the Foss Dyke navigation which connects the Trent to Lincoln and the River Witham. Further north at Littleborough is the site of the Roman town of Segelocum, where a Roman road once crossed the river.

It then reaches the town of Gainsborough with its own Trent Bridge. The river frontage in the town is lined with warehouses, that were once used when the town was an inland port, many of which have been renovated for modern use. Downstream of the town the villages are often named in pairs, representing the fact that they were once linked by a river ferry between the two settlements. These villages include West Stockwith and East Stockwith, Owston Ferry and East Ferry, and West Butterwick and East Butterwick. At West Stockwith the Trent is joined by the Chesterfield Canal and the River Idle and soon after enters Lincolnshire fully, passing to the west of Scunthorpe. The last bridge over the river is at Keadby where it is joined by both the Stainforth and Keadby Canal and the River Torne.

Downstream of Keadby the river progressively widens, passing Amcotts and Flixborough to reach Burton upon Stather and finally Trent Falls. At this point, between Alkborough and Faxfleet the river reaches the boundary with Yorkshire and joins the River Ouse to form the Humber which flows into the North Sea.

Migration of course in historic times
Unusually for an English river, the channel altered significantly during historic times, and has been described as being similar to the Mississippi in this respect, especially in its middle reaches, where there are numerous old meanders and cut-off loops. An abandoned channel at Repton is described on an old map as 'Old Trent Water', records show that this was once the main navigable route, with the river having switched to a more northerly course in the 18th century. Farther downstream at Hemington, archaeologists have found the remains of a medieval bridge across another abandoned channel. Researchers using aerial photographs and historical maps have identified many of these palaeochannel features, a well-documented example being the meander cutoff at Sawley. The river's propensity to change course is referred to in Shakespeare's play Henry IV, Part 1:

Henry Hotspur's speech complaining about the river has been linked to the meanders near West Burton, however, given the wider context of the scene, in which conspirators propose to divide England into three after a revolt, it is thought that Hotspur's intentions were of a grander design, diverting the river east towards the Wash such that he would benefit from a much larger share of the divided Kingdom. Downstream of Burton upon Trent, the river increasingly trends northwards, cutting off a portion of Nottinghamshire and nearly all of Lincolnshire from his share, north of the Trent. The idea for this scene, may have been based on the disagreement regarding a mill weir near Shelford Manor, between local landowners Gilbert Talbot, Earl of Shrewsbury, and Sir Thomas Stanhope which culminated with a long diversion channel being dug to bypass the mill. This took place in 1593 so would have been a contemporary topic in the Shakespearean period.

Prehistory
During the Pleistocene epoch (1.7 million years ago), the River Trent rose in the Welsh hills and flowed almost east from Nottingham through the present Vale of Belvoir to cut a gap through the limestone ridge at Ancaster and thence to the North Sea. At the end of the Wolstonian Stage (c. 130,000 years ago) a mass of stagnant ice left in the Vale of Belvoir caused the river to divert north along the old Lincoln river, through the Lincoln gap, along what is now the course of the Witham. During a following glaciation (Devensian, 70,000 BC) the ice held back vast areas of water – called Glacial Lake Humber – in the current lower Trent basin.  When this retreated, the Trent adopted its current course into the Humber.

Catchment

The Trent basin covers a large part of the Midlands, and includes the majority of the counties of Staffordshire, Derbyshire, Leicestershire, Nottinghamshire and the West Midlands; but also includes parts of Lincolnshire, South Yorkshire, Warwickshire and Rutland. The catchment is located between the drainage basins of the Severn and its tributary the Avon to the south and west, the Weaver to the north-west, the tributaries of the Yorkshire Ouse to the North and the basins of the Welland, Witham and Ancholme to the east.

These lower reaches are protected from tidal flooding by a series of floodbanks and defences.

Elsewhere there is a distinct contrast between the open limestone areas of the White Peak in the Dove catchment, and the large woodland areas, including Sherwood Forest in the Dukeries area of the Idle catchment, the upland Charnwood Forest, and the National Forest in the Soar and Mease drainage basins respectively.

Land use is predominantly rural, with some three-quarters of the Trent catchment given over to agriculture. This ranges from moorland grazing of sheep in the upland areas, through to improved pasture and mixed farms in the middle reaches, where dairy farming is important. Intensive arable farming of cereals and root vegetables, chiefly potatoes and sugar beet occurs in the lowland areas, such as the Vale of Belvoir and the lower reaches of the Trent, Torne and Idle.
Water level management is important in these lowland areas, and the local watercourses are usually maintained by internal drainage boards and their successors, with improved drainage being assisted by the use of pumping stations to lift water into embanked carrier rivers, which subsequently discharge into the Trent.

The less populous rural areas are offset by a number of large urbanised areas including the conurbations of Stoke-on-Trent, Birmingham and the surrounding Black Country in the West Midlands; and in the East Midlands the major university cities and historical county seats of Leicester, Derby and Nottingham. Together these contain the majority of the 6 million people who live in the catchment.

The majority of these urban areas are in the upper reaches of either the Trent itself, as is the case with Stoke, or its tributaries. For example, Birmingham lies at the upper end of the Tame, and Leicester is located towards the head of the Soar. Whilst this is not unique for an English river, it does mean that there is an ongoing legacy of issues relating to urban runoff, pollution incidents, and effluent dilution from sewage treatment, industry and coal mining. Historically, these issues resulted in a considerable deterioration in the water quality of both the Trent and its tributaries, especially the Tame. To bring clean water to the West Midlands, Birmingham Corporation created a large reservoir chain and aqueduct system to bring water from the Elan Valley.

Geology

Underlying the upper reaches of the Trent, are formations of Millstone Grit and Carboniferous Coal Measures which include layers of sandstones, marls and coal seams. The river crosses a band of Triassic Sherwood sandstone at Sandon, and it meets the same sandstone again as it flows beside Cannock Chase, between Great Haywood and Armitage, there is also another outcrop between Weston-on-Trent and King's Mill.

Downstream of Armitage the solid geology is primarily Mercia Mudstones, the course of the river following the arc of these mudstones as they pass through the Midlands all the way to the Humber. The mudstones are not exposed by the bed of the river, as there is a layer of gravels and then alluvium above the bedrock. In places, however the mudstones do form river cliffs, most notably at Gunthorpe and Stoke Lock near Radcliffe on Trent, the village being named after the distinctive red coloured strata.

The low range of hills, which have been formed into a steep set of cliffs overlooking the Trent between Scunthorpe and Alkborough are also made up of mudstones, but are of the younger Rhaetic Penarth Group.

In the wider catchment the geology is more varied, ranging from the Precambrian rocks of the Charnwood Forest, through to the Jurassic limestone that forms the Lincolnshire Edge and the eastern watershed of the Trent. The most important in terms of the river are the extensive sandstone and limestone aquifers that underlie many of the tributary catchments. These include the Sherwood sandstones that occur beneath much of eastern Nottinghamshire, the Permian Lower Magnesian limestone and the carboniferous limestone in Derbyshire. Not only do these provide baseflows to the major tributaries, the groundwater is an important source for public water supply.

Sand, gravels and alluvium deposits that overlie the mudstone bedrock occur almost along the entire length of the river, and are an important feature of the middle and lower reaches, with the alluvial river silt producing fertile soils that are used for intensive agriculture in the Trent valley. Beneath the alluvium are widespread deposits of sand and gravel, which also occur as gravel terraces considerably above the height of the current river level. There is thought to be a complex succession of at least six separate gravel terrace systems along the river, deposited when a much larger Trent flowed through the existing valley, and along its ancestral routes through the water gaps at Lincoln and Ancaster.

This ‘staircase’ of flat topped terraces was created as a result of successive periods of deposition and subsequent down cutting by the river, a product of the meltwater and glacially eroded material produced from ice sheets at the end of glacial periods through the Pleistocene epoch between 450,000 and 12,000 years BP. Contained within these terraces is evidence of the mega fauna that once lived along the river, the bones and teeth of animals such as the woolly mammoth, bison and wolves that existed during colder periods have all been identified. Another notable find in a related terrace system near Derby from a warmer interglacial period, was the Allenton hippopotamus.

The lower sequences of these terraces have been widely quarried for sand and gravel, and the extraction of these minerals continues to be an important industry in the Trent Valley, with some three million tonnes of aggregates being produced each year. Once worked out, the remaining gravel pits which are usually flooded by the relatively high water table have been reused for a wide variety of purposes. These include recreational water activities, and once rehabilitated, as nature reserves and wetlands.

During the end of the last Devensian glacial period the formation of Lake Humber in the lowest reaches of the river, meant that substantial lake bed clays and silts were laid down to create the flat landscape of the Humberhead Levels. These levels extend across the Trent valley, and include the lower reaches of the Eau, Torne and Idle. In some areas, successive layers of peat were built up above the lacustrine deposits during the Holocene period, which created lowland mires such as the Thorne and Hatfield Moors.

Hydrology
The topography, geology and land use of the Trent catchment all have a direct influence on the hydrology of the river. The variation in these factors is also reflected in the contrasting runoff characteristics and subsequent inflows of the principal tributaries. The largest of these is the River Tame, which contributes nearly a quarter of the total flow for the Trent, with the other significant tributaries being the Derwent at 18%, Soar 17%, the Dove 13%, and the Sow 8%. Four of these main tributaries, including the Dove and Derwent which drain the upland Peak District, all join within the middle reaches, giving rise to a comparatively energetic river system for the UK.

Rainfall

Like other large lowland British rivers, the Trent is vulnerable to long periods of rainfall caused by sluggish low pressure weather systems repeatedly crossing the basin from the Atlantic, especially during the autumn and winter when evaporation is at its lowest. This combination can produce a water-logged catchment that can respond rapidly in terms of runoff, to any additional rainfall. In 2000 similar conditions occurred again, with above average rainfall in the autumn being followed by further rainfall, producing flood conditions in November of that year.

Another meteorological risk, although one that occurs less often, is that related to the rapid melting of snow lying in the catchment. This can be a result of a sudden rise in temperature after a prolonged cold period, or when combined with extensive rainfall. Many of the largest historical floods were caused by snowmelt, but the last such episode occurred when the bitter winter of 1946-7 was followed by a rapid thaw due to rain in March 1947 and caused severe flooding all along the Trent valley.

At the other extreme, extended periods of low rainfall can also cause problems. The lowest flows for the river were recorded during the drought of 1976, following the dry winter of 1975/6. Flows measured at Nottingham were exceptionally low by the end of August, and were given a drought return period of greater than one hundred years.

Discharge

The river's flow is measured at several points along its course, at a number of gauging stations. At Yoxall, the flow increases to  due to the input of larger tributaries including the Sow and Blithe.

During lower flows the Trent and its tributaries are heavily influenced by effluent returns from sewage works, especially the Tame where summer flows can be made up of 90% effluent. For the Trent this proportion is lower, but with nearly half of low flows being made up of these effluent inflows, it is still significant. There are also baseflow contributions from the major aquifers in the catchment.

Average monthly flows of Trent in cubic metres per second measured at Colwick (Nottingham).

Sediment
In the lower tidal reaches the Trent has a high sediment load, this fine silt which is also known as ‘warp', was used to improve the soil by a process known as warping, whereby river water was allowed to flood into adjacent fields through a series of warping drains, enabling the silt to settle out across the land. A number of the smaller Trent tributaries are still named as warping drains, such as Morton warping drain, near Gainsborough.

Warp was also used as a commercial product, after being collected from the river banks at low tide, it was transported along the Chesterfield Canal to Walkeringham where it was dried out and refined to be eventually sold as a silver polish for cutlery manufacturers.

Floods

The Trent is widely known for its tendency to cause significant flooding along its course, and there is a well documented flood history extending back for some 900 years. In Nottingham the heights of significant historic floods from 1852 have been carved into a bridge abutment next to Trent Bridge, with flood marks being transferred from the medieval Hethbeth bridge that pre-dated the existing 19th-century crossing. Historic flood levels have also been recorded at Girton and on the churchyard wall at Collingham.

One of the earliest recorded floods along the Trent was in 1141, and like many other large historical events was caused by the melting of snow following heavy rainfall, it also caused a breach in the outer floodbank at Spalford.

Early bridges were vulnerable to floods, and in 1309 many bridges were washed away or damaged by severe winter floods, including Hethbeth Bridge. In 1683 the same bridge was partially destroyed by a flood that also meant the loss of the bridge at Newark. Historical archives often record details of the bridge repairs that followed floods, as the cost of these repairs or pontage had to be raised by borrowing money and charging a local toll.

The largest known flood was the Candlemas flood of February 1795, which followed an eight-week period of harsh winter weather, rivers froze which that meant mills were unable to grind corn, and then followed a rapid thaw. Due to the size of the flood and the ice entrained in the flow, nearly every bridge along the Trent was badly damaged or washed away. The bridges at Wolseley, Wychnor and the main span at Swarkestone were all destroyed. In Nottingham, residents of Narrow Marsh were trapped by the floodwaters in their first floor rooms, boats were used to take supplies to those stranded. Livestock was badly affected, 72 sheep drowned in Wilford and ten cows were lost in Bridgford. The vulnerable flood bank at Spalford was breached again, floodwaters spreading out across the low-lying land, even reaching the River Witham and flooding Lincoln. Some  were flooded for a period of over three weeks.

A description of the breach was given as follows:

The bank is formed upon a plain of sandy nature, and when it was broken in 1795, the water forced an immense breach, the size of which may be judged from the fact that eighty loads of faggots and upwards of four hundred tons of earth were required to fill up the hole, an operation which took several weeks to complete.

The flood bank was subsequently strengthened and repaired, following further floods during 1824 and 1852.

The principal flood of the 19th century and the second largest recorded, was in October 1875. Although not quite as large as 1795 this flood devastated many places along the river, at Burton upon Trent much of the town was inundated, with flooded streets and houses, and dead animals floating past in the flood. Food was scarce, "in one day 10,000 loaves had to be sent into the town and distributed gratuitously to save people from famine". In Newark the water was deep enough to allow four grammar school boys to row across the countryside to Kelham.

On 17–18 March 1947 the Trent overtopped its banks in Nottingham. Large parts of the city and surrounding areas were flooded with 9,000 properties and nearly a hundred industrial premises affected some to first floor height. The suburbs of Long Eaton, West Bridgford and Beeston all suffered particularly badly. Two days later, in the lower tidal reaches of the river, the peak of the flood combined with a high spring tide to flood villages and 2,000 properties in Gainsborough.

Flooding on the Trent can also be caused by the effects of storm surges independently of fluvial flows, a series of which occurred during October and November 1954, resulting in the worse tidal flooding experienced along the lower reaches. These floods revealed the need for a tidal protection scheme, which would cope with the flows experienced in 1947 and the tidal levels from 1954, and subsequently the floodbanks and defences along the lower river were improved to this standard with the works being completed in 1965. In December 2013, the largest storm surge since the 1950s occurred on the Trent, when a high spring tide combined with strong winds and a low pressure weather system, produced elevated tidal river levels in the lower reaches. The resulting surge overtopped the flood defences in the area near Keadby and Burringham, flooding 50 properties.

The fifth largest flood recorded at Nottingham occurred in November 2000, with widespread flooding of low-lying land along the Trent valley, including many roads and railways. The flood defences around Nottingham and Burton constructed during the 1950s, following the 1947 event, stopped any major urban flooding, but problems did occur in undefended areas such as Willington and Gunthorpe, and again at Girton where 19 houses were flooded.
The flood defences in Nottingham that protect 16,000 homes and those in Burton where they prevent 7,000 properties from flooding were reassessed after this flood, and were subsequently improved between 2006 and 2012.

History of navigation

Nottingham seems to have been the ancient head of navigation until the Restoration, due partly to the difficult navigation of the Trent Bridge.  Navigation was then extended to Wilden Ferry, near to the more recent Cavendish Bridge, as a result of the efforts of the Fosbrooke family of Shardlow.

Later, in 1699, the baron William Paget (Lord Paget), who owned coal mines and land in the area, obtained an Act of Parliament to extend navigation up to Fleetstones Bridge, Burton, despite opposition from the people of Nottingham. Lord Paget seems to have funded the work privately, building locks at King's Mill and Burton Mills and several cuts and basins. The Act gave him absolute control over the building of any wharves and warehouses above Nottingham Bridge. Lord Paget leased the navigation and the wharf at Burton to George Hayne, while the wharf and warehouses at Wilden were leased by Leonard Fosbrooke, who held the ferry rights and was a business partner of Hayne. The two men refused to allow any cargo to be landed which was not carried in their own boats, and so created a monopoly.

In 1748, merchants from Nottingham attempted to end this monopoly by landing goods on the banks and into carts, but Fosbrooke used his ferry rope to block the river, and then created a bridge by mooring boats across the channel, and employing men to defend them. Hayne subsequently scuppered a barge in King's Lock, and for the next eight years goods had to be transhipped around it. Despite a Chancery injunction against them, the two men continued with their action. Hayne's lease expired in 1762, and Lord Paget's son, the Earl of Uxbridge, gave the new lease to the Burton Boat Company.

The Trent and Mersey Canal was authorised by Act of Parliament in 1766, and construction from Shardlow to Preston Brook, where it joined the Bridgewater Canal, was completed by 1777. The canal ran parallel to the upper river to Burton upon Trent, where new wharfs and warehouses at Horninglow served the town, and the Burton Boat Company were unable to repair the damaged reputation of the river created by their predecessors. Eventually in 1805, they reached an agreement with Henshall & Co., the leading canal carriers, for the closure of the river above Wilden Ferry.  Though the river is no doubt legally still navigable above Shardlow, it is probable that the agreement marks the end of the use of that stretch of the river as a commercial navigation.

The lower river
The first improvement of the lower river was at Newark, where the channel splits into two. The residents of the town wanted to increase the use of the branch nearest to them, and so an Act of Parliament was obtained in 1772 to authorise the work. Newark Navigation Commissioners were created, with powers to borrow money to fund the construction of two locks, and to charge tolls for boats using them. The work was completed by October 1773, and the separate tolls remained in force until 1783, when they were replaced by a one-shilling (5p) toll whichever channel the boats used.

Users of the Trent and Mersey Canal, the Loughborough Canal and the Erewash Canal next demanded major improvements to the river down to Gainsborough, including new cuts, locks, dredging and a towing path suitable for horses. The Dadfords, who were engineers on the Trent and Mersey Canal, estimated the cost at £20,000, but the proposal was opposed by landowners and merchants on the river, while the Navigator, published in 1788, estimated that around 500 men who were employed to bow-haul boats would have lost their jobs. Agreement could not be reached, and so William Jessop was asked to re-assess the situation. He suggested that dredging, deepening, and restricting the width of the channel could make significant improvements to the navigable depth, although cuts would be required at Wilford, Nottingham bridge and Holme. This proposal formed the basis for an Act of Parliament obtained in 1783, which also allowed a horse towing path to be built. The work was completed by September 1787, and dividends of 5 per cent were paid on the capital during 1786 and 1787, increasing to 7 per cent, the maximum allowed by the Act, after that. Jessop carried out a survey for a side cut and lock at Sawley in 1789, and it was built by 1793.

At the beginning of the 1790s, the Navigation faced calls for a bypass of the river at Nottingham, where the passage past Trent Bridge was dangerous, and the threat of a canal running parallel to the river, which was proposed by the Erewash and the Trent and Mersey Canal companies. In order to retain control of the whole river, they supported the inclusion of the Beeston Cut in the bill for the Nottingham Canal, which prevented the Erewash Canal company from getting permission to build it, and then had the proposal removed from the Nottingham Canal company's bill in return for their support of the main bill. The parallel canal was thwarted in May 1793, when they negotiated the withdrawal of the canal bill by proposing a thorough survey of the river which would result in their own legislation being put before parliament. William Jessop performed the survey, assisted by Robert Whitworth, and they published their report on 8 July 1793. The major proposals included a cut and lock at Cranfleet, where the River Soar joins the Trent, a cut, locks and weirs at Beeston, which would connect with the Nottingham Canal at Lenton, and a cut and lock at Holme Pierrepont. An Act of Parliament was obtained in 1794, and the existing proprietors subscribed the whole of the authorised capital of £13,000 (equivalent to £ in ), themselves.

By early 1796, the Beeston cut was operational, with the Cranfleet cut following in 1797, and the Holme cut in 1800, with the whole works being finished by 1 September 1801. The cost exceeded the authorised capital by a large margin, with the extra being borrowed, but the company continued to pay a 7 per cent dividend on the original shares and on those created to finance the new work. In 1823 and again in 1831, the Newark Navigation Commissioners proposed improvements to the river, so that larger vessels could be accommodated, but the Trent Navigation Company were making a good profit, and did not see the need for such work.

Competition
The arrival of the railways resulted in significant change for the company. Tolls were reduced to retain the traffic, wages were increased to retain the workforce, and they sought amalgamation with a railway company. The Nottingham and Gainsborough Railway offered £100 per share during 1845, but this was rejected. Tolls decreased from £11,344 (equivalent to £ in ), during 1839 to £3,111 (equivalent to £ in ), in 1855. Many of the connecting waterways were bought by railway companies, and gradually fell into disrepair. In an attempt to improve the situation, the company toyed with the idea of cable-hauled steam tugs, but instead purchased a conventional steam dredger and some steam tugs. The cost of improvements was too great for the old company, and so an Act of Parliament was obtained in 1884 to restructure the company and raise additional capital. Failure to raise much of the capital resulted in another Act being obtained in 1887, with similar aims and similar results. A third Act of 1892 reverted the name to the Trent Navigation Company, and this time, some improvements were performed.

With traffic still between 350,000 and 400,000 tonnes per year, Frank Rayner became the engineer in 1896, and the company were persuaded that major work was necessary if the navigation was to survive. The engineer for the Manchester Ship Canal, Sir Edward Leader Williams, was commissioned to survey the river, while negotiations with the North Staffordshire Railway, who owned the Trent and Mersey Canal and had maintained its viability, ensured that some of the clauses from previous Acts of Parliament did not prevent progress. Raising finance was difficult, but some was subscribed by the chairman and vice-chairman, and construction of Cromwell Lock began in 1908. The Newark Navigation Commissioners financed improvements to Newark Town lock at the same time, and dredging of the channel was largely funded by selling the 400,000 tonnes of gravel removed from the river bed. At , Cromwell lock could hold a tug and three barges, and was opened on 22 May 1911. The transport of petroleum provided a welcome increase to trade on the river, but little more work was performed before the beginning of the First World War.

Modernisation
Increased running costs after the First World War could not be met by increasing the tolls, as the company had no statutory powers to do so, and so suggested that the Ministry of Transport should take over the navigation, which they did from 24 September 1920. Tolls were increased, and a committee recommended improvements to the river. Nottingham Corporation invested some £450,000 on building the locks authorised by the 1906 Act, starting with Holme lock on 28 September 1921, and finishing with Hazelford lock, which was formally opened by Neville Chamberlain on 25 June 1926. A loan from Nottingham Corporation and a grant from the Unemployment Grants Committee enabled the company to rebuild Newark Nether lock, which was opened on 12 April 1926.

During the early 1930s, the company considered enlarging the navigation above Nottingham, in conjunction with improvements to the River Soar Navigation, between Trent Lock and Leicester. There were also negotiations with the London and North Eastern Railway, who were responsible for the Nottingham Canal between Trent Lock and Lenton. Plans for new larger locks at Beeston and Wilford were abandoned when the Trent Catchment Board opposed them. The Grand Union refused to improve the Soar Navigation, because the Trent Navigation Company could not guarantee 135,000 tons of additional traffic. The company also considered a plan to reopen the river to Burton, which would have involved the rebuilding of Kings Mills lock, and the construction of four new locks. An extra set of gates were added to Cromwell lock in 1935, effectively creating a second lock, while the Lenton to Trent Lock section was leased from the LNER in 1936, and ultimately purchased in 1946.

Frank Rayner, who had been with the company since 1887, and had served as its engineer and later general manager since 1896, died in December 1945. Sir Ernest Jardine, who as vice-chairman had partly funded the first lock at Cromwell in 1908, died in 1947, and the company ceased to exist in 1948 when the waterways were nationalised. The last act of the directors was to pay a 7.5 per cent dividend on the shares in 1950. Having taken over responsibility for the waterway, the Transport Commission enlarged Newark Town lock in 1952, and the flood lock at Holme was removed to reduce the risk of flooding in Nottingham. More improvements followed between 1957 and 1960. The two locks at Cromwell became one, capable of holding eight Trent barges, dredging equipment was updated, and several of the locks were mechanised. Traffic increased from 620,000 tonnes during 1951 to 1,017,356 tonnes during 1964, but all of this was below Nottingham. Commercial carrying above Nottingham ceased during the 1950s, to be replaced by pleasure cruising.

Barges still transport gravel from pits at Girton and Besthorpe to Goole and Hull.

Navigation today

However, for practical purposes, navigation above the southern terminus of the Trent and Mersey Canal (at Shardlow) is conducted on the canal, rather than on the river itself. The canal connects the Trent to the Potteries and on to Runcorn and the Bridgewater Canal.

Down river of Shardlow, the non-tidal river is navigable as far as the Cromwell Lock near Newark, except in Nottingham (Beeston Cut & Nottingham Canal) and just west of Nottingham, where there are two lengths of canal, Sawley and Cranfleet cuts.  Below Cromwell lock, the Trent is tidal, and therefore only navigable by experienced, well-equipped boaters.  Navigation lights and a proper anchor and cable are compulsory.  Associated British Ports, the navigation authority for the river from Gainsborough to Trent Falls, insist that anyone in charge of a boat must be experienced at navigating in tidal waters.

Between Trent Falls and Keadby, coastal vessels that have navigated through the Humber still deliver cargoes to the wharves of Grove Port, Neap House, Keadby, Gunness and Flixborough.
The use of a maritime pilot on the Trent is not compulsory for commercial craft, but is suggested for those without any experience of the river. Navigation can be difficult, and there have been a number of incidents with ships running aground and in one case, striking Keadby Bridge. The most recent occurrence involved the Celtic Endeavour being aground near Gunness for ten days, finally being lifted off by a high tide.

Trent Aegir

The Aegir occurs when a high spring tide meets the downstream flow of the river. The funnel shape of the river mouth exaggerates this effect, causing a large wave to travel upstream as far as Gainsborough, Lincolnshire, and sometimes beyond. The Aegir cannot travel much beyond Gainsborough as the shape of the river reduces the Aegir to little more than a ripple, and weirs north of Newark-on-Trent, Nottinghamshire, stop its path completely.

The literal North/South divide

The Trent historically marked the boundary between Northern England and Southern England. For example, the administration of royal forests was subject to a different justice in eyre north and south of the river, and the jurisdiction of the medieval Council of the North started at the Trent. In addition to this, the University of Oxford was formerly divided into a northern nation and a southern nation, the former consisting of English people north of the River Trent and the Scots and the latter consisting of English people south of the Trent, the Irish, and the Welsh.

Some traces of the former division remain: the Trent marks the boundary between the provinces of two English Kings of Arms, Norroy and Clarenceux. This divide was also described in Michael Drayton's epic topographical poem, Poly-Olbion, The Sixe and Twentieth Song, 1622:

Pollution history
It is not clear when pollution first became an issue for the River Trent, but in the late 1880s, it had a thriving salmon fishery, with the river producing an annual catch of some 3,000 fish, a decade later, this had fallen to 100. The collapse of the fishery was due to the rapid population increase of the towns that developed following the Industrial Revolution. The tipping point being the introduction of piped water and a basic sewer network, which meant that effluent, which was previously stored in cesspits, was carried away through drains into the nearest brook.

This was a particular problem in Stoke-on-Trent and the growing towns of the Potteries. Due to the relatively small size of the Trent and its tributaries such as the Fowlea Brook, which drained these towns, the river and brooks were unable to dilute the inflow of domestic sewage and soon became overwhelmed and badly polluted.

At the downstream end of the Potteries was Trentham Hall, here pollution became so bad that the owner, the Duke of Sutherland, made a claim against the local Fenton council in 1902. He also took out an injunction against the council to prevent the ongoing contamination causing a "most foul and offensive stench", the river not even being suitable to water grazing cattle on the estate.
 Although he provided land for a sewage works nearby at Strongford, the problems continued such that in 1905 the Levenson-Gower family left Trentham altogether and moved to their other properties, including Dunrobin Castle in Scotland.

Until the outbreak of the Second World War, the main source of pollution continued to be the Potteries, although there was contamination from the Tame and other lower tributaries it was not as prominent. During the 1950s, however, the same problem of effluent dilution that occurred in Stoke began to become significant in Birmingham and the Black Country. Domestic effluent and polluting discharges from the metal working industries in the upper reaches, combined to affect the whole length of the tributary River Tame.

The Tame pollution also reached the Trent as well, with one of the worse affected reaches being that downstream of the confluence with the Tame through Burton, this being exacerbated by its late introduction of sewage treatment, and the substantial wastewater arising from the breweries in the town. Angling clubs in Burton used the Dove or local lakes for fishing, as the Trent through the town was absent of any fish. Downstream, the inflow of cleaner water from the Dove and then the Derwent meant that conditions improved enough to allow recreational coarse fishing in the lower reaches.

The pollution of the "Trent catchment was probably at its worst in the late 1950s", this being the result of the ongoing industrialisation of the urban areas, combined with the interruption and under investment caused by two world wars, which lead to only piecemeal improvements of the sewerage treatment infrastructure taking place. One effect of this pollution was that the upper and middle reaches were completely devoid of any fish life.

John Jennings, the local MP for Burton highlighted these problems in a speech to the House when he stated in 1956, that as in previous years the river had been declared unsafe for swimming on advice from the medical officer, and how its unhealthy condition affected a local rowing club.

From the 1960s onwards, there were gradual but steady improvements to the inadequate sewage works and sewers built during the Victorian era in the urban areas, but this was expensive, and took time to complete. The changes were helped by the introduction of more stringent pollution control legislation, which required industrial waste to be discharged to sewers, and the formation of the Trent River Authority, which had new duties relating to managing water quality issues. Other changes, such as the replacement of town gas with natural gas, saw the end of the polluting and toxic coal tar emissions to rivers in 1963.

In 1970, Mr Jennings again raised the issue of pollution through Burton, the River Tame continuing to be a source of the problem, and further improvements were promised. The responsibility for sewage treatment works still belonged primarily to local authorities, which often meant an uncoordinated approach and a proliferation of small works. In 1974, these works were transferred to the regional water authorities, with the Severn Trent Water Authority taking over the role for the Trent catchment. This led to increased investment, the closure of older and smaller works, with sewage treatment being combined at larger modern works such as Strongford and Minworth.

The economic recession in the 1970s meant that there was a considerable contraction of heavy industrial sectors, reducing pollution loadings from factories and foundries. Later improvements such as the series of purification lakes that were constructed on the Tame in the 1980s, which allowed contaminated sediment to settle out from the river, also reduced pollution levels, and lessened the impact of first flush runoff events in the lower Tame and the middle Trent.

The improvements in water quality along the Trent were recorded through the chemical monitoring of the river from the 1950s. Polluting substances such as ammonia showed a reduction, as did the biochemical oxygen demand, an indicator of the contamination present in the river. There were corresponding increases in dissolved oxygen, an indicator of a healthy river environment.
The programme of monitoring also extended to taking biological samples, and one of the first biotic indices used for assessing the ecological rather than the chemical quality of rivers was developed by the local river board in the 1960s. Using invertebrates as an indicator of pollution levels, it was appropriately named the Trent Biotic index.

By 2004, it was reported that the Trent was cleaner than it had been in the last 70–80 years, and that episodic incidents of pollution had also reduced considerably since the 1970s. The river remains vulnerable to these pollution events, such as the one that occurred in October 2009 when an accidental release of cyanide from a factory into the sewer system in Stoke-on-Trent, affected the treatment works at Strongford. This resulted in the release of raw sewage and the chemical into the river, killing thousands of fish, and posing a health risk to river users as far south as Burton.

Although now considered cleaner, there are still problems with diffuse pollution from agricultural runoff and urban areas, as well as point source contamination from sewage works. The improvements that have taken place mean that the Trent can be used for public water consumption. Riverside lakes near Shardlow act as a reserve water source for Nottingham and Derby, and water is also abstracted at Torksey and Newton-on-Trent for supplies in Lincolnshire.

Wildlife and ecology
Artificial changes along the Trent, due to navigation, farming, mineral extraction and drainage works, mean that much of the riparian landscape has been altered, reducing the amount of natural habitat. The river channel links the remaining, but fragmented wetland areas and nature reserves, providing a refuge for native and migrant species. These include wildfowl and wading birds that use the Trent Valley as a migration corridor, with the river also being used as a wildlife route by mammals such as otters and non-native American mink. It forms part of the Severn-Trent flyway, a route used by migratory birds to cross Great Britain.

Additional nature conservation areas were created beside the river in the 20th century, when a number of disused gravel pits, were rehabilitated as nature reserves. One of the most important of these is Attenborough Nature Reserve, a  Site of Special Scientific Interest (SSSI) which is visited by wildfowl such as Eurasian wigeon and common teal. Wading birds such as Eurasian oystercatcher and great bittern have also been observed at the reserve; as have kingfishers, reed warblers and water rails.

Other managed wetland sites along the river include Beckingham Marshes, Croxall Lakes, Drakelow, and Willington Gravel Pits. At Besthorpe near Newark, breeding pairs of little egrets and grey herons have been observed.

The Trent valley also links together other SSSI and local nature reserves, which have varying habitats not only for birds, but also mammals, insects and fish, a good example is the tributary River Mease where the entire watercourse has been designated both as a SSSI and a European special area of conservation.

One of the more unusual ecological sites is Pasturefields nature reserve near Hixon, an inland saltmarsh, which is a rare habitat for the UK. A vestige of the saline marshes created by the brine springs that seep from the groundwater of the Mercia mudstones, the reserve contains salt tolerant species normally found on the coast, such as sea plantain, arrowgrass and milkwort.

Improvements in water quality and subsequent fish stocks, in combination with the ban on the use of certain persistent pesticides have meant that otters have now returned to the Trent system, having been absent as recently as the 1980s. A survey in 2003 showed a doubling in the number of sites where evidence, such as spraints and footprints of these elusive animals were found.  They have also now been sighted at locations such as Wolseley, Willington, and Attenborough. Seals have been reported up to near the head of the tidal section at Newark.

Fishing

Evidence of fishing along the Trent can be traced back to the Neolithic period, with the possible remnants of a fish weir discovered in the abandoned river channels at Hemington. More definitive finds from the medieval period were also found at this site and  near Colwick. These consisted of V shaped alignments of stakes; wattle panels and a large wicker trap and demonstrate that passive fishing techniques were in use on the river.

The Domesday catalogue showed that there were many successful mills and fisheries along the Trent. Mills were important locations for fish and eel traps, the eels being caught during ‘quill time’ between mid-August and early September. Written records show that in the 12th century landlords were paid in salmon, in lieu of rent at Burton upon Trent.

In the 17th century Izaak Walton described the River Trent as 'One of the finest rivers in the world and the most abounding with excellent salmon and all sorts of delicate fish.' A list composed in 1641 for the Trent, contained thirty types of fish and other species including those that migrated from the sea such as shad, smelt, salmon and flounder, and riverine species such as trout, grayling, perch and pike.

The largest of those listed was the sturgeon, which at one time were caught in the Trent as far upstream as King's Mill, but only in low numbers.

The effluent and industrial pollution of the early 20th century, led to a rapid decline in fish stocks, large stretches of the river became fishless and species such as salmon almost disappeared. As water quality improved from the 1960s onwards, fish numbers recovered, and recreational coarse fishing became more popular.

By the 1970s the Trent was regarded as 'one of the most productive rivers in the British Isles'. by anglers, who would travel from South Yorkshire and other surrounding areas, to fish the Trent as their local rivers still remained badly polluted and were absent of fish.

Analysis of catch returns from 1969 to 1985, showed that the fish caught most often by anglers were barbel, bream, bleak, carp, chub, dace, eel, gudgeon, perch, and roach. Over the study period the returns revealed that there was a variation in the species caught, with a shift from roach and dace based catches, to one of chub and bream, a change that was perceived by anglers to represent a ‘serious detriment’ to the fishery. This led to comments that the river had become ‘too clean for its fish’, and its popularity, especially for match fishing, declined from the mid 1980s. Competition from other fisheries such as well stocked ponds and lakes with better amenities and more consistent catches of fish also meant a reduction in the appeal of fishing the Trent.

Recreational fishing is still popular, although anglers no longer line the banks as they once did. There are many fishing clubs that use the river, with catches including barbel, bream, carp, chub, dace, pike, and roach.

Salmon, a species that became virtually extinct due to historic pollution, have been progressively reintroduced on the tributaries since 1998, with thousands of salmon parr being released into the Dove and its tributary the Churnet each year.

Places along the Trent

Cities and towns on or close to the river include:
 Stoke-on-Trent
 Stone
 Rugeley
 Burton upon Trent
 Castle Donington
 Long Eaton
 Beeston
 Nottingham
 Newark-on-Trent
 Gainsborough

Crossing the Trent
Prior to the mid-18th century there were few permanent crossings of the river with only four bridges downstream of the Tame confluence: the old medieval bridges at Burton, Swarkestone, Nottingham (known as Hethbeth Bridge) and Newark, all first built by 1204. There were, however, over thirty ferries that operated along its course, and numerous fords, where passage was possible, their locations indicated by the suffix ‘ford’ in many riverside place-names such as Hanford, Bridgford, and Wilford.

Glover noted in 1829 that all three types of crossing were still in use on the Derbyshire section of the Trent, but that the fords were derelict and dangerous. These fording points only allowed passage across the river when water levels were low; when the river was in flood a long detour could be required. He reported that they could be treacherous to the unwary, since there were few gauges to show if the river had become too deep to cross, and that they were rarely used except by locals. One of the earliest known fords was the crossing at Littleborough, constructed by the Romans it was paved with flagstones, and supported by substantial timber pilings.

Ferries often replaced these earlier fording points, and were essential where the water was too deep, such as the tidal section of the lower river. As they were a source of income, they were recorded in the Domesday Book at a number of locations including Weston on Trent and Fiskerton, both of which were still in operation in the middle of the 20th century. The ferry boats used along the Trent ranged in size from small rowing boats, to flat decked craft that could carry livestock, horses, and in some case their associated carts or wagons.

Bridges over the river were created in Saxon times at Nottingham at least (and for a time just north of Newark at Cromwell, although it is not known how long that bridge site lasted), and formed major centres of trade and military importance. King Edward fortified the Nottingham bridge in 920, while a notable battle took place at Burton's bridge in 1322, and another in 1643. The medieval bridges of Burton and Nottingham survived relatively intact until the 1860s, when both were replaced and demolished. The central arches of the medieval Swarkestone bridge were knocked out by the great flood of 1795 and rebuilt, but the bridge's more rural location allowed large portions of the medieval bridge to survive and remain in use today. At Newark, the last bridge on the Trent until modern times, the bridge was rebuilt in 1775. At least one other medieval attempt was made to bridge the Trent near Wilden at Hemington, but this was gone long before the end of the Middle Ages. The complex of three bridges provides evidence of attempts to keep a crossing open over slightly more than two hundred years from 1097, with three bridges constructed on the same site but felled by scouring, floods and course migration of the river to the south eroding the bridgehead. The bridge was probably gone by around 1311 when nearby Wilden ferry, near Shardlow was first recorded, and the site thereafter went without a bridge until Cavendish Bridge opened around 1760. As no archive sources record that the Hemington bridge existed, there may have been other medieval bridge projects now forgotten. (Until the late 18th century, a long period of stagnation for economic and technical reasons limited the number of bridges over the Trent; it has been noted that relatively few bridges were constructed in England on new sites anywhere between around 1250–1300 and 1750.) Cavendish Bridge was itself damaged beyond repair by a flood in March 1947, requiring a temporary Bailey bridge to be used until a new concrete span was constructed in 1957.

When bridge construction resumed, toll bridges were often constructed on the site of ferry routes. Such was the case at Willington, Gunthorpe and Gainsborough.

At Stapenhill near Burton, there were similar calls for a new bridge, a tally of usage showed that the foot ferry was being used 700 times per day. The new Ferry Bridge was opened in 1889, although it needed the financial support of the brewer and philanthropist Michael Bass to pay for the construction, and later in 1898 to purchase the existing ferry rights so that it became free of tolls.

The toll bridges were mostly bought out by the county councils in the 19th century following government reforms, one of the earliest being Willington in 1898, the first toll free crossing was marked by a procession across the bridge and a day of celebration.
The only toll bridge that remains across the Trent is at Dunham, although it is free to cross on Christmas and Boxing Day.

Power stations

The tall chimneys and concave shaped cooling towers of the many power stations are a dominant and familiar presence within the open landscape of the Trent valley, which has been widely used for power generation since the 1940s.

The primary reason for locating so many generating stations beside the Trent was the availability of sufficient amounts of cooling water from the river. This combined with the nearby supplies of fuel in the form of coal from the Nottinghamshire and Yorkshire coalfields, and the existing railway infrastructure meant that a string of twelve large power stations were originally constructed along its banks. At one time these sites provided a quarter of the electricity needs of the UK, giving rise to the epithet 'Megawatt Valley'.

Once these early stations reached the end of their functional life, they were usually demolished, although in some cases the sites have been retained and redeveloped as gas fired power stations.

In downstream order, the power stations that continue to use, or have used the river as their source of cooling water are: Meaford, Rugeley, Drakelow, Willington, Castle Donington, Ratcliffe-on-Soar, Wilford, Staythorpe, High Marnham, Cottam, West Burton and Keadby.

The three largest remaining coal-fired stations at Ratcliffe, Cottam and West Burton still use domestic coal supplies, although this is now being replaced by imported coal brought by ship from abroad.

There is one hydroelectric power station on the river, Beeston Hydro at Beeston Weir.

Recreation on the Trent

Along with other major rivers in the Midlands, the Trent is widely used for recreational activities, both on the water and along its riverbanks. The National Watersports Centre at Holme Pierrepont, near Nottingham combines facilities for many of these sports, including rowing, sailing and whitewater canoeing.

The Trent Valley Way created in 1998 as a long-distance footpath, enables walkers to enjoy the combined attractions of ‘the river’s rich natural heritage and its history as an inland navigation’. Extended in 2012, the route now runs from Trent Lock in the south through to Alkborough where the river meets the Humber. It combines riverside and towpath sections, with other paths to villages and places of interest in the wider valley.

Historically swimming in the river was popular, in 1770 at Nottingham there were two bathing areas on opposite banks at Trent Bridge which were improved in 1857 with changing sheds and an assistant. Similar facilities were present in 1870 on the water meadows at Burton-on-Trent, which also had its own swimming club. Open water swimming still takes place at locations including Colwick Park Lake adjacent to the river, with its own voluntary lifeguards. The first person to swim the entire swimmable length of the Trent was Tom Milner, who swam  over nine days in July 2015.

Rowing clubs have existed at Burton, Newark and Nottingham since the mid-1800s, with various regattas taking place between them, both on the river and on the rowing course at the national watersports centre.

Both whitewater and flat water canoeing is possible on the Trent, with published guides and touring routes being listed for the river. There is a canoe slalom course at Stone, a purpose built  artificial course at Holme Pierrepont, and various weirs including those at Newark and Sawley are all used for whitewater paddling. Various canoe and kayak clubs paddle on the river including those at Stone, Burton, and Nottingham.

Established in 1886 the Trent valley sailing club is one of two clubs that use the river for dingy sailing, regattas, and events.  There are also a number of clubs that sail on the open water that has been created as a result of flooded gravel workings which include Hoveringham, Girton, and Attenborough.

Organised trips on cruise boats have long been a feature of the Trent, at one time steam launches took passengers from Trent Bridge to Colwick Park, similar trips run today but in reverse, starting from Colwick and passing through Nottingham they use boats known as the Trent Princess and Trent Lady. Others trips run from Newark castle, and two converted barges; the Newark Crusader and Nottingham Crusader, provide river cruises for disabled people via the St John Ambulance Waterwing scheme.

Tributaries
Although Spenser endowed 'The beauteous Trent' with 'thirty different streams' the river is joined by more than twice that number of different tributaries, of which the largest in terms of flow is the Tame which drains most of the West Midlands, including Birmingham and the Black Country. The second and third largest are the Derwent and the Dove respectively; together these two rivers drain the majority of Derbyshire and Staffordshire, including the upland areas of the Peak District.

The River Soar which drains the majority of the county of Leicestershire, could also be considered as the second largest tributary, as it has a larger catchment area than the Dove or Derwent, but its discharge is significantly less than the Derwent, and lower than the Dove.

In terms of rainfall the Derwent receives the highest annual average rainfall, whereas the Devon, which has the lowest average rainfall is the driest catchment of those tabulated.

List of tributaries

Alphabetical listing of tributaries, extracted from the Water Framework Directive list of water bodies for the River Trent:

See also
List of rivers of Great Britain
Trent River Authority
Trent Valley Line
Trent Valley Way
List of fish in the River Trent
List of crossings of the River Trent
Trent River (Ontario)

Bibliography

Notes

References

External links
Photographs along the Trent in Nottingham from Nottingham21
Catchment Tributaries of the River Trent English Heritage and University of Birmingham research project.
Predictive Modelling of Multi-Period Geoarchaeological Resources at a River Confluence English Heritage, University of Birmingham and University of Exeter research project.
Trent Valley GeoArchaeology 
River Trent through Nottingham. Pictures & slide show.

 
Rivers of Derbyshire
Rivers of Lincolnshire
Rivers of Nottinghamshire
Rivers of Staffordshire
River navigations in the United Kingdom